Erna Wallisch (née Erna Pfannstiel, 10 February 1922 – 16 February 2008) allegedly was a female guard in two Nazi concentration camps, but despite several trials was never convicted. In 2007, she was seventh on the Simon Wiesenthal Center's list of most wanted war criminals that had never been convicted.

Early life 
Wallisch was born Erna Pfannstiel in Benshausen, in Thuringia. Her father was a postal clerk. At the age of 19, she joined the NSDAP and underwent training to become an Aufseherin, or female concentration camp guard.

World War II 
Wallisch first served as a guard at Ravensbrück concentration camp for a year before she was transferred to the Majdanek concentration camp in Lublin Poland. While in service at Majdanek, she met a Nazi guard named Georg Wallisch, and married him in 1944. It is alleged that she was a brutal guard, beating women and children on their way to the gas chambers and personally participated in the selections of inmates to be executed. Survivors described pregnant Wallisch beating a young boy to death. One of the survivors mentioned: "The sweating, breathless face of that monster was something I will never forget."

Legal 

There were three attempts to prosecute Wallisch:

1965: In Graz, charges were dismissed.

1970s: In Vienna, but the prosecutor was unwilling to pursue (nolle prosequi), as the Austrian statutes of limitation had expired.

2005: Historian Efraim Zuroff urged the Austrian Department of Justice to prosecute anew, but its speaker, Christoph Pöchinger declared that there was lack of credible evidence. This unwillingness to prosecute led the Wiesenthal center to put her on the list of most wanted war criminals.

Post-World War II 
In 2007, British author and journalist Guy Walters tracked Wallisch down to a small flat in Vienna, Austria, as part of his research for an upcoming work titled Hunting Evil, about the pursuit of escaped Nazi war criminals. Though Wallisch would not talk to him and the Austrian government claimed that the statute of limitations had expired on her war crimes, Poland explored seeking an indictment against her. Though they had investigated Wallisch for her crimes in the 1970s, the renewed interest as well as evidence from Polish survivors, lead Austrian officials to commission a report on the crimes which had taken place six decades earlier. Before the report could be completed, the 86-year-old Wallisch died in a hospital bed.

See also
 Female guards in Nazi concentration camps

References

1922 births
2008 deaths
Ravensbrück concentration camp personnel
Majdanek concentration camp personnel
Female guards in Nazi concentration camps
German expatriates in Austria
People from Schmalkalden-Meiningen